Richard Andrew Farley (9 December 1952 – 13 May 2006) was an Australian journalist, politician, land rights and civil rights activist for the rights of Indigenous Australians. He emerged in the public's eye as a prominent member of the Council for Aboriginal Reconciliation, an organisation that looked to establish healthy, multicultural relationships between Aboriginal and Torres Strait Islander peoples and non-Indigenous Australians.

Personal life
Farley was born in Townsville, Queensland, on 9 December 1952.

In 1983, Farley married Cathy Reade. Together, they had one son and one daughter, Jeremy and Cailin Farley. They separated in 1996 and Farley went on to date Australian Labor Party MP Linda Burney, the first Indigenous member of the New South Wales Legislative Assembly and the former interim Leader of the New South Wales Opposition.

Farley was described by those close to him as having had "an extraordinary ability to persuade, negotiate and build bridges to gain bipartisan support for the matters he was passionate about".

Career
Farley began his career as a journalist for the Rockhampton Morning Bulletin, and as an advisor to the Federal Minister for Health in the Whitlam Government. He eventually became the executive director of the Cattlemen's Union of Australia and the chief executive of the National Farmers' Federation, a position he held for eight years.

In 1989, while the head of the National Farmer's Federation, collaborating with Phillip Toyne from the Australian Conservation Foundation, Farley succeeded in acquiring a financial contribution from the Australian Government towards the national Landcare volunteer movement. 
Following the investment, Farley committed his life and his career to the needs of farmers, conservationists and to the process of reconciliation towards the Indigenous population.

That same year, Farley ran for the Australian Senate as a candidate for the centrist Australian Democrats. He represented the Australian Capital Territory on the platform of improving a future for all Australians by first establishing co-operation between Settler Australians and Indigenous Australians and by the conservation of the native ecology through the Landcare movement.

Death
On 13 May 2006, at the age of 53, Farley died after his wheelchair overturned outside Balmain Hospital in Sydney. He had been leaving after undergoing rehabilitation treatment for a brain aneurysm which he had suffered five months earlier. 
His funeral was held at St Brigid's Church, in Marrickville. The service was attended not only by numerous prominent politicians and celebrities, but also by Indigenous Australians and rural cattlemen and farmers whom he had represented during his career.
 
He was survived by his partner Linda Burney and two children, to his first wife Cathy Reade, Jeremy and Cailin.

Legacy
Farley was actively involved in Australian politics, with the most notable being his contribution towards the creation of the Landcare movement, an environmental organisation with thousands of volunteers across Australia.

In December 2006, Linda Burney nominated the Rick Farley Memorial Scholarship to encourage young Indigenous Australians to pursue environmental conservation and cultural management, and to honour his career as well as his achievements in life.

References

External links
For love of the land—obituary in The Australian, 15 May 2006
Rick Farley: a remarkable life ends in tragic accident, Sydney Morning Herald, 15 May 2006
Rick Farley addressing the National Press Club, 26 July 2000, in the National Library of Australia collection of portraits

1952 births
2006 deaths
Australian chief executives
Australian activists
Spouses of Australian politicians
People from Townsville